Four ships of the Royal Navy have borne the name HMS Elk, another name for the European moose:

 was an 18-gun  launched in 1804 and broken up in 1812.
 was an 18-gun Cruizer-class brig-sloop launched in 1813 and sold in 1836.
 was a 16-gun brig-sloop launched in 1847. She was renamed WV 13 when she was transferred to the Coastguard in 1863, being renamed WV 28 later that year. She was sold in 1893.
 was a composite screw sloop launched in 1868, used as a tug from 1890 and sold in 1905 for use as a dredger.

See also
 
 

Royal Navy ship names